Worthington is a neighborhood of Louisville, Kentucky located along Brownsboro Road and Ballardsville Road.  In the 1870s, a toll gate was built on Brownsboro Road (then known as Louisville and Brownsboro Turnpike) at its intersection with Ballardsville Road. In the early 1900s the area was primarily potato farms, but residential development which began in the 1940s accelerated with the opening of Interstates 71 and 265 in the late 1960s.

Although the neighborhood has been heavily developed in recent years, Worthington Cemetery at Brownsboro Road and Chamberlain Lane remains a link to this area's rural past. A shopping center including Costco, Cabela's, and Lowe's has been built immediately to the northeast of the I-265/Brownsboro Road interchange. Norton Healthcare has established a major hospital campus in the same area, opening a general hospital in 2009, followed by a children's hospital and a cancer hospital.

References

Further reading

External links
Norton Commons

Neighborhoods in Louisville, Kentucky
1940s establishments in Kentucky
Populated places established in the 1940s